Yui Kamiji and Jordanne Whiley defeated the two-time defending champions Jiske Griffioen and Aniek van Koot in the final, 6–2, 2–6, 5–7 to win the ladies' doubles wheelchair tennis title at the 2014 Wimbledon Championships. It was their third step towards an eventual Grand Slam.

Seeds

  Yui Kamiji /  Jordanne Whiley (champions)
  Jiske Griffioen /  Aniek van Koot (final)

Draw

Finals

References
 Draw

Women's Wheelchair Doubles
Wimbledon Championship by year – Wheelchair women's doubles